In Greek mythology, Crius (or Κριός, Kreios/Krios) was one of the Titans, children of Uranus and Gaia. Like other Titans, Crius lacks much characterization, with no unique domain or mythology of his own; instead, he apparently served a purely genealogical function in mythology, to provide parentage for other figures.

Etymology 
Although "krios" was also the ancient Greek word for "ram", the Titan's chthonic position in the underworld means no classical association with Aries, the ram of the zodiac, is ordinarily made.  Aries is the first visible constellation in the sky at the spring season, marking the start of the new year in the ancient Greek calendar.

Family 
According to Hesiod, with Eurybia, daughter of Gaia ("Earth") and Pontus ("Sea"), he fathered Astraios, Pallas, and Perses. The joining of Astraios with Eos, the Dawn, brought forth Eosphoros, Hesperus, Astraea, the other stars, and the winds.

Mythology 
Joined to fill out lists of Titans to form a total matching the Twelve Olympians, Crius was inexorably involved in the ten-year-long war between the Olympian gods and Titans, the Titanomachy, though without any specific part to play. When the war was lost, Crius was banished along with the others to the lower level of Hades called Tartarus.

As the least individualized among the Titans, he was overthrown in the Titanomachy. M. L. West has suggested how Hesiod filled out the complement of Titans from the core group—adding three figures from the archaic tradition of Delphi, Coeus, and Phoibe, whose name Apollo assumed with the oracle, and Themis. Among possible further interpolations among the Titans was Crius, whose interest for Hesiod was as the father of Perses and grandfather of Hecate, for whom Hesiod was, according to West, an "enthusiastic evangelist".

Genealogical tree

See also 
 Greek mythology in popular culture
 Greek primordial deities

Notes

References 
 Apollodorus, The Library with an English Translation by Sir James George Frazer, F.B.A., F.R.S. in 2 Volumes, Cambridge, MA, Harvard University Press; London, William Heinemann Ltd. 1921. Online version at the Perseus Digital Library. Greek text available from the same website.
 Grimal, Pierre, The Dictionary of Classical Mythology, Wiley-Blackwell, 1996. .
 Hesiod, Theogony from The Homeric Hymns and Homerica with an English Translation by Hugh G. Evelyn-White, Cambridge, MA.,Harvard University Press; London, William Heinemann Ltd. 1914. Online version at the Perseus Digital Library. Greek text available from the same website.
 Hyginus, Fabulae from The Myths of Hyginus translated and edited by Mary Grant. University of Kansas Publications in Humanistic Studies. Online version at the Topos Text Project.
 West, M.L., "Hesiod's Titans", in The Journal of Hellenic Studies, Vol. 105, pp. 174–175. .

External links 
 CRIUS on The Theoi Project
 CRIUS in Mythopedia
 CRIUS from greekmythology.com

Greek gods
Children of Gaia
Titans (mythology)
Condemned souls in Tartarus